15 Years and One Day is a 2013 Spanish drama film directed by Gracia Querejeta. The film was selected as the Spanish entry for the Best Foreign Language Film at the 86th Academy Awards, but it was not nominated. The film is a Tornasol Films and Castafiore Films production, with the participation of TVE and Canal+ and the sponsor of Estudios Ciudad de la Luz.

Cast

Accolades 

|-
| align = "center" rowspan = "4" | 2013 || rowspan = "4" | 16th Málaga Spanish Film Festival || colspan = "2" | Golden Biznaga ||  || rowspan = "4" | 
|-
| Silver Biznaga for Best Screenplay || Gracia Querejeta, Antonio Santos || 
|-
| Silver Biznaga for Best Original Soundtrack || Pablo Salinas || 
|-
| colspan = "2" | Silver Biznaga for Special Jury Prize || 
|-
| rowspan = "7" align = "center" | 2014 ||  rowspan = "7" | 28th Goya Awards || colspan = "2" | Best Film ||  || rowspan = "7" | 
|-
| Best Director || Gracia Querejeta || 
|-
| Best Actor || Tito Valverde || 
|-
| Best Supporting Actress || Maribel Verdú || 
|-
| Best New Actress || Belén López || 
|-
| Best Cinematography || Juan Carlos Gómez || 
|-
| Best Original Song || "Rap 15 años y un día"by Arón Piper, Pablo Salinas, Cecilia Fernández Blanco || 
|}

See also
 List of Spanish films of 2013
 List of submissions to the 86th Academy Awards for Best Foreign Language Film
 List of Spanish submissions for the Academy Award for Best Foreign Language Film

References

External links
 

2013 films
2013 drama films
2010s Spanish-language films
Spanish drama films
Films directed by Gracia Querejeta
Tornasol Films films
2010s Spanish films